Tapura carinata is a species of plant in the Dichapetalaceae family. It is found in the Republic of the Congo and Gabon.

References

Vulnerable plants
carinata
Taxonomy articles created by Polbot